Liège-Guillemins railway station (IATA code: XHN), officially Liège-Guillemins, is the main station in Liège, Belgium. It is one of the most important hubs in the country and is one of the four Belgian stations on the high-speed rail network. The station is used by 15,000 people every day, which makes it the eleventh-busiest station in Belgium and the third in Wallonia. It is operated by the National Railway Company of Belgium (SNCB/NMBS).

History

First station (1842–1863)
The choice to make Liège the crossing point of a railway goes back to the first sketches of the railway from Antwerp to the Rhine, drawn up just after the Belgian Revolution. A royal decree issued on 21 March 1832 mentions it and a law dated 1 May 1834 provides for the creation of four lines, including the "eastern line", from Mechelen to Liège and the Prussian border.

In 1838, only three years after the first continental railway, a line linking Brussels and Ans, in the northern suburbs of Liège, was opened. With the arrival of the railway, Liège needed an interior station. In 1842, a wooden construction was erected on the site of the former convent of the Guillemites. This first Liège-Guillemins railway station was inaugurated in May 1842, linking the valley to the upper Ans station. The Guillemins site, located slightly outside the city centre, was chosen for technical reasons over the local preference for the Place Saint-Lambert. In 1843, the first international railway connection was born, linking Liège to Aachen and Cologne (Germany).

Second and third stations (1863–2009)
The Belgian State, choosing to go against the city authorities who demanded the relocation of the station to the city centre, built a new station in 1863 to replace the original wooden one. Its massive structure and its large French-style fan-shaped canopy illuminating the waiting room were its pride. The architect A.P.J. Lambeau, principal engineer for the Ministry of Railways, was particularly inspired by the buildings of the Gare du Nord and Gare de l'Est stations in Paris. Lambeau is also the architect of the Charleroi-Sud and Namur stations, restored in the 2000s.

The station was modernised and improved in 1882 and in 1905 for the World's Fair in Liège. This Beaux-Arts station was replaced in 1958 by a much criticised "modern" International style building that was used until June 2009, a few months before the opening of the new Calatrava-designed station. The second station was completely demolished to allow the completion of the remaining sections of the new station.

New station
At the end of the 20th century, high-speed trains were introduced, requiring a new station since the existing platforms were too small. The new station, by the Spanish architect Santiago Calatrava, was officially opened on 18 September 2009, with a show by the stage director Franco Dragone. All the tracks around the station have been modernised to allow high-speed arrival and departure.

The new station is made of steel, glass and white concrete. The building costs were €312 million.

Services

Liège-Guillemins station is served by InterCity (IC), Local (L), and Liège RER (S) trains connecting Liège with all major Belgian cities as well as several international destinations such as Aachen, Lille, and Maastricht. In addition to the national trains, Liège-Guillemins station welcomes Thalys and ICE trains, connecting Liège to Brussels, Paris, Aachen, Cologne and Frankfurt. Two new dedicated high-speed tracks were built: HSL 2 (Brussels - Liège) and HSL 3 (Liège - German border).

The station is served by the following services:

High speed services (Thalys) Paris - Brussels - Liège - Aachen - Cologne - Düsseldorf - Essen - Dortmund
High speed services (ICE) Brussels - Liège - Aachen - Cologne - Frankfurt
Intercity services (IC-01) Ostend - Bruges - Gent - Brussels - Leuven - Liège - Welkenraedt - Eupen
Intercity services (IC-09) Antwerp - Lier - Aarschot - Hasselt - Liège (weekends)
Intercity services (IC-12) Kortrijk - Gent - Brussels - Leuven - Liège - Welkenraedt (weekdays)
Intercity services (IC-14) Quiévrain - Mons - Braine-le-Comte - Brussels - Leuven - Liège (weekdays)
Intercity services (IC-18) (Tournai -) Brussels - Namur - Liège (weekdays)
Intercity services (IC-25) Mons - Charleroi - Namur - Huy - Liège - Herstal (weekdays)
Intercity services (IC-25) Mouscron - Tournai - Mons - Charleroi - Namur - Liège - Liers (weekends)
Intercity services (IC-33) Liège - Gouvy - Troisvierges - Luxembourg (weekdays)
Intercity services (IC-33) Liers - Liège - Gouvy - Troisvierges - Luxembourg (weekends)
Local services (L-01) Namur - Huy - Liège
Local services (L-15) Liers - Liège - Rivage - Marloie
S services (S41) Liège - Pepinster - Verviers (weekdays)
S services (S41) Herstal - Liège - Pepinster - Verviers (weekends)
S services (S42) Liers - Liège - Seraing - Flémalle-Haute
S services (S43) Hasselt - Tongeren - Liège - Visé - Maastricht (weekdays)
S services (S43) Liège - Visé - Maastricht (weekends)
S services (S44) Liège - Ans - Waremme (weekdays)
S services (S44) Liège - Ans - Waremme - Landen (weekends)

Liège-Guillemins also sees various Peak (P) trains during the week.

The national trains to Brussels also use the high speed track at 200 km/h, while the Thalys and ICE can go up to 300 km/h (bringing Brussels at only 39' minutes from Liège).

Road connections
Liège-Guillemins is also a transport hub for TEC Bus: more than 1620 buses, carrying 15,000 people, serve the station every day. It is one of the few railway stations in Europe directly connected to a motorway (E40-E25). The connection gives direct access to the 850-place parking structure, behind the station. No cycling path connection exists between the station and the city.

See also
 List of railway stations in Belgium
 List of TGV stations
 High-speed rail in Belgium
 Rail transport in Belgium

References

External links

 
In Pictures: Calatrava's Liège-Guillemins train station

Railway stations in Belgium
Railway stations in Liège Province
Buildings and structures in Liège
Railway stations in Belgium opened in 1842
Santiago Calatrava structures
Neo-futurism architecture
1842 establishments in Belgium